Andrés Ocaña Rabadán (26 April 1955 – 2 March 2017) was a Spanish politician and academic who served as the Mayor of Córdoba from 2009 to 2011.

Ocaña was born in the town of Aguilar de la Frontera in the Province of Córdoba in 1955. He served as a member of the Córdoba city council from 1995 until 2011 during the rule of the governing United Left/The Greens–Assembly for Andalusia (IU).

In 2009, Córdoba mayor Rosa Aguilar resigned from office when she was appointed counselor of the government of Andalusia. Ocaña succeeded Aguilar as the city's mayor. Ocaña served as Mayor from 2009 until 2011, when the opposition People's Party (PP) won an absolute majority in the Córdoba city council in the 2011 municipal elections.

Ocaña died of a myocardial infarction on 2 March 2017, at the age of 62.

References

1955 births
2017 deaths
Politicians from Andalusia
United Left (Spain) politicians
Mayors of Córdoba, Spain
People from Campiña Sur (Córdoba)